Romance Complicated is a 2016 Indian Gujarati language romantic comedy film directed by Dhwani Gautam and produced by Kirti Premraaj Jain, Nishit Jain & Rajiv Sharma. It stars Malhar Pandya and Divya Misra  make their debut as leads in this Gujarati film.

Cast
 Malhar Pandya as Dev Patel
 Divya Misra as Maahi Patel
 Dharmesh Vyas as Dhiraj Patel 
 Shekhar Shukla as Karsan Patel 
 Darshan Jariwala as Tiku Mamaji 
 Nisha Kalamdani as Aashima 
 Umang Acharya as Aaditya 
 Nirmit Vaishnav as Sandeep Patel
 Riddhi Raval Parikh as Aarti Patel
 Shweta Dhasmana as Shweta Patel
 Harish Daghiya as Paresh
 Maulik Nayak as Pappu 
 Aishwaria Dussane as Anushka Joshi 
 Nilofer Khalid as Preeti Patel 
 Yulia Yanina as Elvira
 Dhwani Gautam as Aarsh Malhotra 
 Avani Modi as Pooja Sharma

Production

Development 
The film is produced by Luminescence Films. Written by Dhwani Gautam. Jatin- Pratik and Darshan Raval (Playback Singer) are the music directors for this film. Romance Complicated ropes in big Bollywood singers  such as Sonu Nigam, Shreya Ghoshal, Neeraj Shridhar, Javed Ali,  Aishwarya Majmudar, Darshan Raval  and Priya Patidar have sung songs for this movie. Neeti Mohan and Rashid Ali have rendered their voices to the title track of the movie.

Filming 
Shooting of the film started in post September 2014. The shooting is said to set in some parts of Ahmedabad and Gandhinagar in India, and New York City and Florida in United States.

Casting 
Debutants Malhar Pandya and Divya Misra have signed this movie playing the role of Dev Patel and Maahi Patel. Dharmesh Vyas, Darshan Jariwala and Shekhar Shukla are in a supporting role.

Music 
The soundtrack of the album is composed by Jatin-Pratik & Darshan Raval with lyrics written by Chandresh Kanadia, Darshan Raval, Dashrath Mewal, Dhwani Gautam, Isha Gautam, Jigar Dave, Nilay Patel and Shailabh Sharma. The soundtrack album consists of seven tracks.

Release
The film released on 15 January 2016 in 163 theatres and 591 shows.

Soundtrack

Jatin-Pratik has composed the music of this film and Darshan Raval as Additional Composer. Lyrics of the tracks are written by Dashrath Mewal, Darshan Raval, Jigar Dave, Isha Gautam, Chandresh Kanadia, Nilay Patel and Dhwani Gautam.

References

External links 
 
 

2016 films
2016 romantic comedy films
Films shot in New York City
Films set in Ahmedabad
Films shot in Ahmedabad
Films shot in Gujarat
Indian romantic comedy films
Films shot in Florida
2010s Gujarati-language films